Gisela Robledo Gil (born 13 May 2003) is a Colombian professional footballer who plays as a midfielder for UDG Tenerife and the Colombia women's national team.

Club career
After playing in her native Colombia for América de Cali and Santa Fe, Robledo joined Spanish club UDG Tenerife in December 2021.

International career
Robledo made her senior debut for Colombia on 9 November 2019.

References

2003 births
Living people
Sportspeople from Valle del Cauca Department
Colombian women's footballers
Women's association football midfielders
Women's association football forwards
América de Cali (women) players
Independiente Santa Fe (women) players
UD Granadilla Tenerife players
Colombia women's international footballers
Colombian expatriate women's footballers
Colombian expatriate sportspeople in Spain
Expatriate women's footballers in Spain